Antal Lippay (7 September 1923 – 24 February 2003) was a Hungarian hurdler. He competed in the men's 400 metres hurdles at the 1952 Summer Olympics.

References

1923 births
2003 deaths
Athletes (track and field) at the 1952 Summer Olympics
Hungarian male hurdlers
Olympic athletes of Hungary
Place of birth missing